Dieynaba Sidibé (born July 2, 1990), popularly known as Zeinixx, is a Senegalese slam poet, graffiti artist and activist.

Early years and education 
Sidibé was born in the suburbs of Thiaroye station and grew up in Dakar. When she was a child, she often spent her pocket money on drawing materials. Her mother was against her becoming an artist and so one day she threw away all Sidibé's paints. She wanted her daughter to become a doctor instead. Sidibé however continued painting. At age 18, she began to develop an interest in hip-hop culture and slam poetry and so she moved into graffiti. In 2008, she stopped studying management studies to devote her time on graffiti. She became a member of the hip-hop community at the Africulturban Center outside Dakar, and there she honed her skills in graffiti painting.

Career 
In 2009, at the age of 24, she is known to have become Senegal's first female graffiti artist. Since the beginning of her graffiti career, renowned Senegalese graffiti artist Grafixx al Mukhtar is known to have mentored her. As a way of paying homage to Grafixx al Mukhtar, she named herself Zeinixx, which is a fusion of her name Zeina and his name Grafixx.

Sidibé uses her graffiti to campaign for women's rights and to speak out on social and environmental issues. The theme of women is recurrent in her works, which also reflects on the place of women in sub-Saharan African society.

Each year, for International Women's Rights Day on March 8, she participates in the Women Life project, a graffiti session organised for the occasion.

Her graffiti can be found on the walls of Dakar, including the facade of the U.S. Embassy in Senegal.

References

Living people
Senegalese women artists
21st-century women artists
Senegalese activists
1990 births
Women graffiti artists
Women activists
21st-century Senegalese women
Slam poets